Frajhajm is a dispersed settlement in the Pohorje Hills in the Municipality of Slovenska Bistrica in northeastern Slovenia. The area is part of the traditional region of Styria. It is now included with the rest of the municipality in the Drava Statistical Region.

Church
The local church is dedicated to Saint Henry and belongs to the Parish of Sveti Martin na Pohorju. It dates to the 13th century with 16th- and 17th-century alterations.

Mass graves
Frajhajm is the site of six known mass graves from the period immediately after the Second World War. They all contain the remains of civilian victims and prisoners of war that were brought from Maribor and the surrounding region and murdered in May and June 1945. The Ruše Lodge at Areh 1 Mass Grave is located east of Saint Henry's Church. The Jure Saddle 1–3 mass graves are clustered together in the northeast part of the settlement on a slope below the Zarja Hotel. The local people have marked the site with two logs arranged in a cross shape. The first measures , the second , and the third . The Zarja 1 and 2 mass graves also lie below the Zarja Hotel. The first is between the hotel and the main road, and the second is south of the main road.

References

External links
Frajhajm at Geopedia

Populated places in the Municipality of Slovenska Bistrica